Jani Lajunen (born 16 June 1990) is a Finnish professional ice hockey forward who is currently playing with Örebro HK of the Swedish Hockey League (SHL). He was selected by the Nashville Predators in the 7th round (201st overall) of the 2008 NHL Entry Draft.

Playing career
Having made his debut in SM-liiga in 2008, he made quick progress and became one of the key players with Espoo Blues.
He was selected to the Finnish national team for the 2011 IIHF World Championship. At the age of 20 he scored his first national team goal against Norway in the quarterfinals at his second game of the tournament. Lajunen also scored a goal in the semifinals against Russia. Team Finland went all the way to the final game and swept Sweden 6–1, winning Finland's second IIHF World Championship gold medal to date.

19 February 2013, Lajunen was traded by the Predators to the St. Louis Blues for fellow minor leaguer Scott Ford. He then played for Växjö Lakers of the Swedish Hockey League for two seasons before returning to Finland in joining Tappara on a two-year deal, commencing from the 2015–16 season.

On 5 May 2017 Lajunen agreed to a two-year contract with HC Lugano of the National League (NL). On December 24, 2018, Lajunen was signed to an early two-year contract extension by Lugano through to the end of the 2020–21 season.

On 20 May 2021, Lajunen left the Swiss National League as a free agent after four seasons and returned to the SHL, in agreeing to a two-year contract with Örebro HK.

Career statistics

Regular season and playoffs

International

References

External links

1990 births
Living people
Espoo Blues players
HC Lugano players
Milwaukee Admirals players
Nashville Predators draft picks
Örebro HK players
Peoria Rivermen (AHL) players
Tappara players
Växjö Lakers players
Finnish ice hockey centres
Finnish expatriate ice hockey players in Switzerland
Finnish expatriate ice hockey players in Sweden
Finnish expatriate ice hockey players in the United States
Sportspeople from Espoo
Ice hockey players at the 2018 Winter Olympics
Olympic ice hockey players of Finland